"Shadowboxin'" is a song by American rapper and Wu-Tang Clan member GZA, featuring fellow Wu-Tang member Method Man. It was released as the fourth and final single from GZA's second studio album Liquid Swords (1995), on March 28, 1996. The song was produced by RZA.

Background and composition
The song contains dialogue from the film Shaolin vs Lama, and samples "Trouble, Heartaches & Sadness" by Ann Peebles. Method Man raps the first and third verses, while GZA raps the second. According to Method Man, GZA was supposed to rap two verses on the track.

Critical reception
The song received generally positive reviews. XXL wrote that the repetitive chop of the sample "set the stage for Meth and GZA's master lyricism". In an interview with Wax Poetics, GZA praised Method Man's rapping, saying that the song "seemed more like Meth's track".

Track listing
Track listing adapted from Discogs:

A-side:

1. Shadowboxin' (Clean) 3:31

2. Shadowboxin' (LP version) 3:31

3. Shadowboxin' (Instrumental) 3:31

B-side:

1. 4th Chamber (Clean) 4:07

 -Featured artists: RZA, Ghostface Killah, Killah Priest

 -Producer: RZA

2. 4th Chamber (LP) 4:07

3. 4th Chamber (Instrumental) 4:07

Charts

References

1995 songs
1996 singles
Geffen Records singles
GZA songs
Method Man songs
Song recordings produced by RZA
Songs written by Method Man
Songs written by RZA